Cyann & Ben were a Parisian experimental rock band, formed in 2001. They released three albums and were signed to Gooom Disques before signing to Ever Records. When Cyann left the group in early 2009 to pursue a solo career, the remaining members of the band started a new musical project called Yeti Lane.

Discography

Albums
 Spring (2003, France: Gooom Disques; US: Locust Music)
 Happy Like an Autumn Tree (2004, Gooom Disques)
 Sweet Beliefs (2006, Ever Records)

EPs
 Cyann & Ben (2001, Gooom Disques)
 Sunny Morning (2006, Ever Records)

Singles
 "Words" (2006, Ever Records)

External links
Cyann & Ben's official website
Cyann & Ben's official MySpace site
Yeti Lane's official website

Musical groups from Paris
French post-rock groups
Locust Music artists